Ambankalai is a village of Thiruvattar in the Kanniyakumari district of India.

Farming
Ambankalai is primarily a farming community, producing crops such as banyan, coconut, and pepper.  A canal-like stream which originates from nearby dams such as Pechiparai, Perunchani, and Kodaiyyar supplies the village most of its water.

Language
Tamil and Malayalam are the most common languages spoken in Ambankalai.

Religion
 Christians
 Hindus

Villages in Kanyakumari district